The East Bank fault is one of three large faults that runs underneath Portland, Oregon. It runs under the University of Portland.

References

Seismic faults of Oregon